New Church may refer to:

Church buildings
 New Church (Amsterdam), 15th-century church in Amsterdam, The Netherlands
 New Church (Constantinople), 9th-century church in Constantinople, Turkey
 New Church of the Theotokos, 6th-century church in Jerusalem, Israel
 Nykirken ("the New Church"), a 12th-century church in Bergen, Norway

Church organization
 The New Church (Swedenborgian), a Protestant denomination

Location
 New Church, Virginia, a census designated place in Virginia, USA

See also 
 Nouvelle-Église, French spelling